The North Carolina State Capitol Police is a capitol police force responsible for policing North Carolina state government buildings in Wake County, North Carolina. The force is part of the North Carolina Department of Public Safety. The force does not police the buildings of the North Carolina General Assembly, which is the responsibility of the separate North Carolina General Assembly Police.

History
The force was formed by the North Carolina General Assembly on 13 August 1967, in response to a spate of thefts and incidents of vandalism at state government buildings in Raleigh, the state capital.

The new force originally started with a budget of $34,704 per year, and had seven officers under the command of Chief Ray Sorrell, who had previously been the police chief in Garner, North Carolina. The primary responsibilities of the force were to patrol state government facilities in Raleigh and to supervise the operation and security of state government parking lots.

Prior to the formation of the State Capitol Police, the state relied on a force of security guards who provided security outside business hours. After the State Capitol Police Force was created, 18 security guards remained a part of the force, and provided a security presence when the uniformed police officers were not on duty.

The force was originally part of the General Services Division of the Department of Administration, and the headquarters were in the East Administration Building on East Jones Street, Raleigh.

Operations
Commanded by State Capitol Police Chief R.E. "Chip" Hawley, the force currently provides a range of services, including escorting high-value cash movements, criminal investigations and surveillance through the Criminal Investigations Unit, crowd management through the Civil Disturbance Team, emergency telecommunications, including alarm and surveillance  monitoring, and parking enforcement.

In 2011, the force was reorganised, and had 40 sworn officers, 18 non-sworn security guards, and three civilian staff. The annual budget was $1,447,696.

See also
 Capitol police
 List of law enforcement agencies in North Carolina
 North Carolina General Assembly Police

References

External links
Official Website of the North Carolina State Capitol Police

State law enforcement agencies of North Carolina
Specialist police departments of North Carolina
1967 establishments in North Carolina
Capitol police
Organizations based in Raleigh, North Carolina